There are many different dances of the Tripuri people, the largest ethnic group in the state of Tripura.

Types of dances

Goria 

The Goria dance is performed during the Goria puja festival, in the month of April, and includes people from other ethnic groups in addition to the Tripuri themselves. The dance is accompanied by drums and flutes, and consists of both sexes dancing from village to village in a gradually increasing tempo through various mudra which mimic the movements of different aspects of nature.

Hai-hak 

Hai-hak is a dance which is specific to the Halam community within the Tripuri. It is performed to honor the goddess Lakshmi after the annual harvest, and is typically done at her place of worship.

Hojagiri 

Hojagiri is a dance performed by young women of the Reang clan. It consists of four to six members in a team singing and balancing various objects on their head and hands, while only moving the lower half of the body.

Jhum 

Jhum is a dance which is typically performed by girls and boys.

Lebang Boomani 

Both men and women participate in the Lebang Boomani dance. The men use bamboo clappers called tokkas to set a beat while the women join them waving colorful scarves to catch the lebang. The rhythmic play of the clappers is thought to attract the lebang out of their hiding places allowing the women to catch them. The dance is accompanied by musical instruments like the flute, khamb, the percussion instrument pung, and the sarinda. Women adorn themselves with silver chains and bangles and ear and nose rings made of bronze.

Mamita 

The Mamita dance is performed at the Mamita Festival, the harvest festival of the Tripuri people.

Mosak sumani 

Mosak sumani is a dance which is performed as a hunting ritual. It mimics the act of hunting through elaborate gestures.

Owa 
The dance is one of the traditional dances of the Mog people of Tripura, who also perform the Sangrai dance. The Mogs are Buddhists, and the Owa -Cho -labre is one of their main Buddhist festivals. The Mogs celebrate the Owa festival on the full moon day of Ashwin in the Bengali calendar. They attend the Buddhist temple, and later launch paper boats or toy boats in the river.

Sangrai 

The Sangrai dance is also performed by the Mog tribe during the Sangrai festival in April.

References